USS Wakulla is a name used more than once by the United States Navy:

 , a cargo ship in commission from 1918 to 1919
 , a gasoline tanker in commission from 1945 to 1946

United States Navy ship names